The Concerto for Oboe and Orchestra is a composition for solo oboe and orchestra by the American composer John Corigliano.  The work was commissioned by the New York State Council on the Arts and was first performed in Carnegie Hall on November 9, 1975, by the oboist Bert Lucarelli and the American Symphony Orchestra under the conductor Kazuyoshi Akiyama.

Composition

Background
Corigliano described the composition of the Oboe Concerto in the score program notes, writing:

Structure
The concerto has a duration of roughly 26 minutes and is composed in five short movements:
Tuning Game
Song
Scherzo
Aria
Rheita Dance

Instrumentation
The work is scored for a solo oboe and orchestra, comprising two flutes (doubling piccolo), oboe, two clarinets (doubling E-flat clarinet), two bassoons, two horns, trumpet, trombone, timpani, three percussionists, xylophone, harp, piano (doubling celesta), and strings.

Reception
Edward Seckerson of Gramophone praised the concerto, writing:

See also
List of compositions by John Corigliano

References

Concertos by John Corigliano
1975 compositions
Corigliano